Roland Geyer is professor of industrial ecology at the Bren School of Environmental Science and Management, University of California at Santa Barbara. He is a specialist in the ecological impact of plastics.

In March 2021, Geyer wrote in The Guardian that humanity should ban fossil fuels, just at it had earlier banned tetraethyllead (TEL) and chlorofluorocarbons (CFC).

References

External links 
https://www.rolandgeyer.com/about
https://www.researchgate.net/profile/Roland_Geyer3

Living people
Year of birth missing (living people)
University of California, Santa Barbara faculty
Alumni of the University of Surrey
German academics